William Herschel was a British astronomer and composer who became famous for discovering the planet Uranus.

William Herschel may also refer to:

 Sir William Herschel, 2nd Baronet (1833–1917), British officer

See also
William Herschel Telescope
William Herschel Museum